Jean Toussaint de la Pierre, marquis de Frémeur (1697–1759) was a French aristocrat and soldier. He commanded the 5th Dragoon Regiment between 1727 and 1744.  Between 1758 and 1759 de Frémeur served as Governor of Minorca following its Capture of Minorca from the British in 1756. He died in the post on 2 April 1759.

See also 
 List of Governors of Minorca

1697 births
1759 deaths
French soldiers
Ancien Régime office-holders
French military personnel of the Seven Years' War